Worth is an American financial, wealth management and lifestyle magazine founded in 1986 and re-launched by Sandow in 2009. The magazine addresses financial, legal and lifestyle issues for high-net-worth individuals. Each issue is organized into four sections: "Make" focuses on making money and entrepreneurship; "Grow" centers on wealth management and investing; "Live" highlights philanthropy, lifestyle and passion investing; and "Creator" covers luxury products, services and experiences.

Distribution
Worth is mailed six times a year to individuals listed on a proprietary database of high-net-worth households in major markets, including: the New York metropolitan area, Fairfield County, the Delaware Valley, Boston, Chicago, South Florida, Dallas, Houston, San Francisco, Los Angeles, and Orange County, and more than 5,000 executives at registered invested investment advisors (RIAs) with assets under management of $100 million or greater, as well as 300 multifamily offices (MFOs) nationwide.

The magazine is available on some newsstands and has an advertising rate base of 125,000 and is audited by BPA Worldwide.

Worth Power 100
Launched in 2010, Worth assembles an annual list of The 100 Most Powerful People in Finance. They named President of the European Central Bank, Mario Draghi, finance's most powerful person in 2012. Former titleholders include Apple Inc. CEO, Tim Cook (2011) and U.S. Federal Reserve Chairman, Ben Bernanke (2010).

Paid content
Worth charges financial advisors $2500 per month for advertorial content to appear in each bimonthly issue.

Awards
Folio Magazine’s Eddie & Ozzie Awards

 2012: Gold, Silver and Bronze for Best Cover
 2011: Gold for the Best Cover
 2010: Gold for Best Redesign Society of Publication Designers
 2010: Gold for Best Redesign

See also
Departures (magazine)
Luxury magazine
Monocle (UK magazine)
Robb Report
Ultra high net worth individual

References

External links

Business magazines published in the United States
Lifestyle magazines published in the United States
Magazines established in 1986
Magazines published in New York City